Sovetsk, formerly Kukarka, is a town and the administrative center of Sovetsky District in Kirov Oblast, Russia. Population:

Etymology
The origins of the name "Kukarka" are uncertain. It may derive from Mari words kü (stone) and karman (fortress) or from kugyrak (great). Attempts have been made to trace it to either Udmurt (kar "town") or Turkic (kukar "burned-away forest"). It is not related to the Russian word "" (kukharka, "female cook").

History
In the 12th century, it was a capital of the local principality of Chumbylat, a renowned Mari leader and warrior. Kukarka was occupied in 1594 by Russians during colonization of Mari land. Later it was a sloboda in Vyatka Governorate of the Russian Empire. It was granted urban-type settlement status in 1918. Town status was granted to it in 1937, at which time its name was changed.

Administrative and municipal status
Within the framework of administrative divisions, Sovetsk serves as the administrative center of Sovetsky District. As an administrative division, it is incorporated within Sovetsky District as the Town of Sovetsk. As a municipal division, the Town of Sovetsk is incorporated within Sovetsky Municipal District as Sovetskoye Urban Settlement.

Notable people
Sovetsk is the birthplace of Vyacheslav Molotov.

References

Notes

Sources

External links
Mojgorod.ru. Entry on Sovetsk 

Cities and towns in Kirov Oblast
Yaransky Uyezd